This is a list of the operating passenger rail transit systems in the United States. This list does not include intercity rail services such as the Alaska Railroad or Amtrak and its state-sponsored subsidiaries. "Region" refers to the metropolitan area based around the city listed, where applicable.

Operating

Under construction

See also
 List of rail transit systems in North America
 List of rapid transit systems (includes other countries)
 List of tram and light rail transit systems (includes other countries)
 List of streetcar systems in the United States (all-time list, streetcar/interurban/light rail only)
 Urban rail transit
 Commuter rail in North America
 Light rail in North America
 Streetcars in North America

References

Passenger rail transportation in the United States
Transit systems
Railway electrification in the United States